"Miss Emily's Picture" is a song written by Red Lane, and recorded by American country music artist John Conlee.  It was released in August 1981 as the second single from the album With Love.  The song reached #2 on the Billboard Hot Country Singles & Tracks chart.

Content
The song is about a young man trying to deal with the recent end of a long-term relationship with a woman named Emily. Photographic reminders of her are everywhere, including his nightstand, his office and his billfold, the latter which he shows friends at a nightclub where he stops after work. The photographs, among other things, trigger deep emotional pain and memories of lost love and broken romance, as he finds solace only by "straighten(ing) Miss Emily's picture now and then."

Chart performance

References

1981 singles
John Conlee songs
MCA Records singles
Songs written by Red Lane
1981 songs